PS Princess Margaret was a passenger vessel built for the London and South Western Railway and London, Brighton and South Coast Railway in 1893.

History

The ship was built by Scotts of Greenock and launched on 14 April 1893.  She was constructed for a joint venture between the London and South Western Railway and the London, Brighton and South Coast Railway for the passenger trade to the Isle of Wight.

On 10 March 1910 she was in collision with the destroyer . The destroyer's bows were badly smashed.

In 1912 a strong flood tide carried her against the flagship . Her stern was slightly twisted, and the Victory's companion ladder was damaged.

On 6 December 1920 she damaged her stern in a collision with the destroyer .

In 1923 she passed to the Southern Railway and was scrapped in 1928.

References

1893 ships
Steamships of the United Kingdom
Paddle steamers of the United Kingdom
Ships built on the River Clyde
Ships of the London and South Western Railway
Ships of the London, Brighton and South Coast Railway
Ships of the Southern Railway (UK)